The James Rossiter Hoyle Professorship of Music at the University of Sheffield was established in 1927 and endowed with £16,000 by the will of Augusta Rossiter Hoyle in memory of her late husband, James (died 1926), a manufacturer of steel armour-piercing shells who had been president of the Sheffield Musical Union and a master cutler.

List 
 1928–1948: Frank Henry Shera
 1948–1968: James Stewart Deas
 1968–1974: Samuel Basil Deane
 1975–1993: Edward James Clarke Garden
 1993–2007: Eric Fillenz Clarke, FBA
 2008–present: Simon Patrick Keefe

References 

University of Sheffield
Professorships in music